Nabha is a city and municipal council in the Patiala district in the south-west of the Indian state of Punjab. It was the capital of the former Nabha State. Nabha is also a sub-division city which comes under Patiala district.

Geography

It has an average elevation of 246 metres (807 feet).

Demographics

 India census, Nabha had a population of 67,972. Males constitute 53% of the population and females 47%. Nabha has an average literacy rate of 74%, higher than the national average of 59.5%: male literacy is 79%, and female literacy is 69%. In Nabha, 10% of the population is under 6 years of age.

Landmarks of the city 

Hira Mahal : Royal Palace of Maharaja Hira singh of Nabha State is famously known as Hira Mahal, This is current Residence of the royal family. The gardens and orchards surrounding it have developed into the Hira Mahal Colony.
18 Bhuja Durga Shiv Mandir: It is one of the old temples of Nabha city. Located near Patiala Gate opposite Hira Mahal.
Tapia Mandir: It is about 100 years old temple. It is a strong belief among people of Nabha that visiting this temple brings happiness in their lives.
Qila Mubarak: Situated at the heart of the city in a dilapidated condition. Various government offices are housed here including the courts shifted to new building at Mini-Secretariat.
Hira Singh Park: Now known as municipal park, near Duladdi Gate. The park is home to the statue of Maharaja Hira Singh Nabha.
 Royal Samadhis: on a circular road, built-in memory of the deceased rulers of Nabha, now in a state of disrepair.
The Courthouse of Nabha, the original residence of Wazir Ishwari Singh Katoch, Prime Minister of Kangra, father of Maharani Lilavati and cousin of Maharaja Sansar Chand of Kangra (father-in-law of Maharaja Ranjit Singh).
Old Temple of Shri Hanuman Ji (near Civil Hospital), Old Temple of Attharan Bhuji Mata Rani (Patiala Gate), Shri Vedas Mandir (Sadar Bazar), and Kali Mata Mandir (near Dulladi Gate) are famous Hindu worship places.
 Gurdwara Dera Baba Ajaypal Singh, famously known as Gurdwara Ghodhiyan Walla and Gurdwara Akalgarh Sahib.
 Mahtab Nagar Nabha, named after Sardar Mehtab Singh Grewal, Mandi Minister with Nabha Maharaja Hira Singh Court.
 King George V Silver Jubilee Park, near Santoshi Mata Mandir, Dulladi Gate
Mata Rajrajeshwari Balasundari Ji Mandir, popularly known as  wala mandir, is a great mighty temple with great historical significance, built approximately 250–300 years ago by the king of the state. This temple has long been a point of religious beliefs and attracts people from faraway areas.
Mata Jwala JI Mandir, Bhattan Street. Presently the Temple is being taken care by Mata Jwala Ji Committee and Young Friends Club which consists of the Municipal Councilor as the President followed by the residents and trustees of the temple. Since 1960 regularly each year the committee organizes Jagran which till date continues and is the oldest running program in the city.
Old Haveli- This is the most horror place in Nabha, where nobody thinks to go close. The history of the Haveli makes it full of Goosebumps. Visiting Haveli will be a very good and scary experience.

There are two locations of Royal Samadhis. One is for the family of Hira Singh, the other, for the original rulers of Nabha, is located on the grounds of Punjab Public School, near the water tank, on what was originally known as Shyam Bagh (near Jamunawali Sark (Road)). There rests Maharaja Devinder Singh, his two sons, his wives, Maharani Lilavati, Maharani Mann Kaur and "Cheteanwali" Rani.

Dr. Sumerendra Vir Singh Chauhan, from the family of Maharani Lilavati, and uncle of the present Raj Kumari of Nabha, wife of Maharaja Pratap Singh's second son, is negotiating with the present authorities to allow for repairs to take place of the Royal samadhis of the original rulers. Also, the Samadhi of Maharani Lilavati's mother is located in the Ram Temple near Hira Mahal.

Modern amritsar 

In 1947, Nabha formed a part of Patiala and East Punjab States Union (PEPSU). At a subsequent reorganization, Patiala was created as a district and Nabha formed a subdivision in Patiala District.

The modern Nabha is a thriving if somewhat dusty town (about 25 kilometers from Patiala). Nabha is famous as a manufacturing hub of combine harvesters
A new colony HIRA ENCLAVE (PUDA) has been established on the outskirts of Nabha city and has 864 plots with a population capacity of about 5000 people

Like many other cities of India, Nabha has landmarks called "gates" which roughly circumscribe the city.  In Nabha, these are Patiala Gate, Alhoran Gate, Dulladi Gate, Mehs Gate and Bouran Gate.

References

External links 

 Genealogy of the ruling chiefs of Nabha
 History Of Nabha
 Guru Har Rai Connection

Cities and towns in Patiala district